Ak-Talaa is a district of Naryn Region in Kyrgyzstan. The administrative seat lies at Baetov.

Geography
The district is located in the western part of Naryn Region and it is confined by Moldo Too from north and north-east, Baybiche Too from south and south-east, and Fergana Range from west. The mountains are characterized by severely dissected topography and high gravitational energy of slopes. The differences in absolute mean sea levels ranges from 2600 to 4737 m in mountains, and from 1500 to 2600 - in valleys. Approximately 87.5% of the district is occupied by mountains, and 12.5% - by valleys. The hydrological conditions are dominated by  Naryn, Ala-Buga and their tributaries Terek, Jaman-Davan, Komorchok, Kurtka, Korgon, etc. Lake Song-Köl is at the northern border of the district.

Climate
Minimum temperatures in winter can be as low as  -25°C in valleys, and -35°C in mountains. In summer, maximum temperatures varies from +30°C in valleys, to +20°C in mountains.  Average yearly precipitation varies from 300 mm in valleys, and up to 700 mm in mountains. Number of days with snow cover is 150-200 per year in mountains, and up to 100 - in valleys. Snow loads in mountain areas are 100-200 kg/m2 with maximums up to 300 kg/m2. A snow cover is up to 20 cm in valleys and 40-80 cm in mountains. The maximum winds reaches 19–22 to 25 m/s in valleys, and up to 55 m/s in mountains (elevations above 3500 m).

Population

Rural communities and villages
In total, Ak-Talaa District include 19 settlements in 13 rural communities. Each rural community can consist of one or several villages. The rural communities and settlements in the Ak-Talaa District are:

 Ak-Tal (seat: Ak-Tal)
 Ak-Chiy (seat: Ak-Chiy; incl. Jangy-Tilek)
 Baetov (seat: Baetov; incl. Kayyngdy-Bulak)
 Jangy-Talap (seat: Jangy-Talap)
 Jerge-Tal (seat: Cholok-Kayyng; incl. Jerge-Tal)
 Kara-Bürgön (seat: Kara-Bürgön)
 Kök-Jar (seat: Ak-Kyya; incl. Kök-Jar)
 Kongorchok (seat: Kongorchok)
 Kosh-Döbö (seat: Kosh-Döbö)
 Kyzyl-Beles (seat: Kadyraly)
 Terek (seat: Terek; incl. Orto-Syrt)
 Togolok-Moldo (seat: Kara-Oy)
 Ügüt (seat: Ügüt; incl. Baygönchok)

References 

Districts of Naryn Region